Acacia hockingsii, also known as Hocking's wattle, is a shrub belonging to the genus Acacia and the subgenus Phyllodineae that is native to parts of north eastern Australia.

Description
It has phyllodes rather than true leaves. The ascending to erect phyllodes have a narrowly linear shape and are shallowly curved to shallowly sigmoid. When it blooms it produces simple inflorescences that occur singly in the axils with spherical flower-heads containing 30 golden-coloured flowers. The seed pods that form after flowering have narrowly oblong to linear shape and are convex over the seeds.

Taxonomy
It belongs to the Acacia johnsonii group along with Acacia eremophiloides, Acacia gnidium and Acacia ixodes but can be distinguished by its longer phyllodes. Another member of the group, Acacia islana is also only found in the Isla Gorge and but with much shorter phyllodes. It also resembles Acacia sabulosa.

Distribution
The shrub has a limited distribution on the Isla Gorge National Park area of the Central region of Queensland where it is found on sandstone plateaus growing in skeletal sandy soils among Eucalyptus'' woodland communities. Its range extends through the central highlands from around Taroom. Originally the species was thought to exist in only three populations within the Isla Gorge National Park but other plants have been found south of Isla Gorge beyond the border of the Wondekai Nature Reserve with more plants located in the Palmgrove National Park.

See also
 List of Acacia species

References

hockingsii
Flora of Queensland
Plants described in 1980
Taxa named by Leslie Pedley